Roberto Ortiz Cervantes (born December 8, 1985) is a Mexican boxer.

Professional career
In October 2010, Ortiz beat veteran Salvador Carreón to win the WBA Fedecaribe light welterweight title.

On June 26, 2011 Roberto upset undefeated Antonio Lozada, Jr. to win the WBC Silver light welterweight title. He kept the title until September 6, 2014, when he lost for the first time in his professional career against Argentinian pugilist Lucas Matthysse. The fight was staged in the U.S. Bank Arena of Cincinnati, Ohio, and the Mexican was knockout in the second round.

Professional record

|- style="margin:0.5em auto; font-size:95%;"
|align="center" colspan=8|35 Wins (26 knockouts), 5 Losses, 2 Draws
|- style="margin:0.5em auto; font-size:95%;"
|align=center style="border-style: none none solid solid; background: #e3e3e3"|Res.
|align=center style="border-style: none none solid solid; background: #e3e3e3"|Record
|align=center style="border-style: none none solid solid; background: #e3e3e3"|Opponent
|align=center style="border-style: none none solid solid; background: #e3e3e3"|Type
|align=center style="border-style: none none solid solid; background: #e3e3e3"|Rd., Time
|align=center style="border-style: none none solid solid; background: #e3e3e3"|Date
|align=center style="border-style: none none solid solid; background: #e3e3e3"|Location
|align=center style="border-style: none none solid solid; background: #e3e3e3"|Notes
|-align=center
|Loss || 35-4-2 ||align=left| Vergil Ortiz Jr.
| || 2 (10)
| || align=left|
|align=left|
|-align=center
|Loss || 35-3-2 ||align=left| Jose Eduardo Lopez Rodriguez
| || 10
| || align=left|
|align=left|
|-align=center
|Loss || 35-2-2 ||align=left| Cletus Seldin
| || 3 (10)
| || align=left|
|align=left|
|-align=center
|Draw || 35-1-2 ||align=left| Diego Cruz
| || 12
| || align=left|
|align=left|
|-align=center
|Win || 35-1-1 ||align=left| Jose Guadalupe Rosales
| || 8
| || align=left|
|align=left|
|-align=center
|Win || 34-1-1 ||align=left| Pascual Salgado
| || 4 (10)
| || align=left|
|align=left|
|-align=center
|Win || 33-1-1 ||align=left| Nestor Fernando Garcia
| || 9 (10)
| || align=left|
|align=left|
|-align=center
|Win || 32-1-1 ||align=left| Juan Jesus Rivera
| || 10
| || align=left|
|align=left|
|-align=center
|Loss || 31-1-1 ||align=left| Lucas Matthysse
| || 2 (12)
| || align=left|
|align=left|
|-align=center
|Win || 31-0-1 ||align=left| Ramiro Alcaraz
| || 5 (12)
| || align=left|
|align=left|
|-align=center
|Win || 30-0-1 ||align=left| Reyes Sanchez
| || 12
| || align=left|
|align=left|
|-align=center
|Win || 29-0-1 ||align=left| Jorge Romero
| || 10 (12)
| || align=left|
|align=left|
|-align=center
|Win || 28-0-1 ||align=left| Fidel Muñoz
| || 6 (12)
| || align=left|
|align=left|
|-align=center
|Win || 27-0-1 ||align=left| John Carlo Aparicio
| || 12
| || align=left|
|align=left|
|-align=center

References

External links

|-

Boxers from Coahuila
Sportspeople from Torreón
Welterweight boxers
Light-welterweight boxers
1985 births
Living people
Mexican male boxers